Therapia Lane depot is a tram depot, situated in the London Borough of Sutton between Therapia Lane and Beddington Lane. Built on the site of former railway sidings, all tram maintenance, repairs and control functions are based in a purpose-built building, erected in 1998.

The depot has sufficient stabling for up to 24 tram sets, and a double-track workshop with all required facilities to perform almost all maintenance. Additionally, system control room is located within the building, as well as a base for the British Transport Police to monitor the network.

References

Tramlink
Trams in London
Buildings and structures in the London Borough of Sutton
Railway depots in London